Trestolone enanthate, also known as 7α-methyl-19-nortestosterone 17β-enanthate (MENT enanthate), is an androgen and anabolic steroid (AAS) and progestogen which was never marketed. It is an androgen ester; specifically, it is the C17β enanthate (heptanoate) ester of trestolone (7α-methylestr-4-en-17β-ol-3-one). Trestolone enanthate has low affinity for sex hormone-binding globulin (SHBG), similarly to testosterone enanthate.

See also
 List of androgen esters § Esters of other synthetic AAS

References

Abandoned drugs
Androgen esters
Androgens and anabolic steroids
Enanthate esters
Estranes
Ketones
Prodrugs
Progestogens
Synthetic estrogens